Haim Silvas (born November 21, 1975) is a retired Israeli soccer player, and the current manager of the Israeli Premier League club Hapoel Tel Aviv. He is best known for his years at Maccabi Haifa, where he scored a historic goal against European regional power, AFC Ajax.

Early life
was born and raised in Haifa, Israel, to an Israeli family of Sephardi Jewish descent.

Honours
Israel State Cup (1):
1995
Liga Leumit (2):
2001-02, 2002-03

See also 
 List of Jewish footballers
 List of Jews in sports
 List of Jews in sports (non-players)
 List of Israelis

References

External links
Profile and biography of Haim Silvas at Maccabi Haifa's official website
Stats at Bnei Yehuda's official website

1975 births
Living people
Israeli Jews
Sephardi Jews
Jewish footballers
Israeli footballers
Israel international footballers
Footballers from Haifa
Maccabi Haifa F.C. players
Maccabi Petah Tikva F.C. players
Beitar Jerusalem F.C. players
Bnei Yehuda Tel Aviv F.C. players
Hapoel Kfar Saba F.C. players
Maccabi Ahi Nazareth F.C. players
Hapoel Ironi Kiryat Shmona F.C. players
Hapoel Acre F.C. players
Hapoel Be'er Sheva F.C. players
Hapoel Bnei Tamra F.C. players
Ahva Arraba F.C. players
Hapoel Afula F.C. players
Hapoel Afula F.C. managers
Hapoel Ra'anana A.F.C. managers
Hapoel Ironi Kiryat Shmona F.C. managers
Hapoel Haifa F.C. managers
Bnei Sakhnin F.C. managers
Israeli Premier League managers
Israeli people of Greek-Jewish descent
Association football midfielders
Israeli football managers